Gentry is a surname. Notable people with the surname include:

Alvin Gentry (born 1954), American basketball coach
Alwyn Howard Gentry (1945-1993), American botanist
Bobbie Gentry (born 1944), American singer-songwriter
Brady P. Gentry (1896-1966), U.S. congressman from Texas
Charles B. Gentry (1884–1955), American academic administrator
Chris Gentry (born 1977), Musician, model and Artist Manager
Curt Gentry (1931-2014), American writer
Craig Gentry (computer scientist) (born 1973), American computer scientist
Craig Gentry (born 1983), American professional baseball player
Dennis Gentry (born 1959), American professional football player
Eve Gentry (1909–1994), American modern dancer, pilates instructor
Gary Gentry (born 1946), Major League Baseball pitcher
Herbert Gentry (1919-2003), American Expressionist painter
Howard Scott Gentry (1903-1993), American botanist
Jerauld Richard Gentry (1935-2003), American test pilot and military officer
Kenneth Gentry (born 1950), American theologian
Loyd Gentry, Jr. (born 1925), American horse trainer
Meredith Poindexter Gentry (born 1809), U.S. congressman from Tennessee
Minnie Gentry (1915–1993), American actress
Richard Gentry (1788-1837), American politician and military officer
Robert Gentry (actor) (born 1940), American actor
Robert V. Gentry (born 1933), Young Earth Creationist and nuclear physicist
Ron Gentry (born 1943), American politician
Rufe Gentry (1918-1997), Major League Baseball pitcher
Sommer Gentry, American mathematician
Teddy Gentry (born 1952), member of the country music band Alabama
Troy Gentry (1967-2017), member of the country music duo Montgomery Gentry
Viola Gentry (1894-1988), American aviator
William Gentry (1899-1991), New Zealand military leader
Zach Gentry (born 1996), American football player